Patrick Schmidt (born 10 September 1993) is a German professional footballer who plays as a striker for FC Ingolstadt.

External links
 
 
 

1993 births
Living people
People from Homburg, Saarland
German footballers
Footballers from Saarland
Association football forwards
Germany youth international footballers
2. Bundesliga players
3. Liga players
Regionalliga players
FC Schalke 04 II players
FC 08 Homburg players
1. FC Saarbrücken players
1. FC Heidenheim players
Dynamo Dresden players
SV Sandhausen players
FC Ingolstadt 04 players